Brigadier-General Archibald John Arnott Wright,  (19 January 1851 – 18 January 1943) was a British Army officer.

Military career
Wright was commissioned into the 30th Regiment of Foot on 22 October 1870. He was promoted to lieutenant on 28 October 1871, and to captain on 10 November 1880. He became adjutant of the 3rd Battalion, the East Lancashire Regiment in September 1890. He saw action during the Second Boer War for which he was appointed a Companion of the Order of the Bath. Following the end of this war, he was on 30 October 1902 promoted to colonel and appointed in command of the 15th Regimental District, head quarter of the East Yorkshire Regiment based in Beverley. After commanding a district in South Africa, he became General Officer Commanding the West Riding Division in April 1908 and then commanded a brigade during the First World War.

References

1851 births
1943 deaths
British Army generals of World War I
Companions of the Order of the Bath
30th Regiment of Foot officers
East Lancashire Regiment officers
British Army personnel of the Second Boer War
British Army brigadiers